Volsinii, Volsini or Vulsini can refer to the following items:

 Volsinii, ancient name for Bolsena
 Monti Volsini, a mountain range near Lake Bolsena
 Vulsini, a volcanic caldera complex in Italy

See also
 Bolsena (disambiguation)